Devarbhavi is a village in Kumta Taluka. It is next to Torke village.

Temples
 Kengal Parameshwari Temple, Devarbhavi

References

Villages in Uttara Kannada district